

Graphical timeline
This timeline concentrates on the "creative" digital camera models from Olympus, i.e. those where there is the possibility to control aperture, shutter speed and focus.

Olympus digital cameras